"Last Year" is a 2006 song by Lucie Silvas.

Last Year may also refer to:

 Last Year: The Nightmare, a 2018 video game
 Last Year, a song by alt-J from the 2017 album Relaxer

Other uses
 The Last Year, a 1951 German drama film

See also
 Next Year (disambiguation)